Re:Creations is the third EP by American alternative rock band There for Tomorrow. It was released through Hopeless Records on October 19, 2010. Re:Creations includes remixes done by There for Tomorrow as well remixes by DJs Twerkshop and DallasK. The EP remixes tracks from A Little Faster, and features two new tracks.

Reception 

Upon release, Re:Creations received little coverage, with the exception of two reviews by AltPress and Campus Circle. Both publications praised the re-arrangements, finding the remixes better than the original songs. Brien Overly of Campus Circle remarked that "...the potential shown on this EP bodes very well for whatever the foursome have in store...", while Robert Ham of AltPress called it "downright likeable".

Both critics praised the remix of "Deathbed". Overly described it as "...darker and moodier than the original...with the addition of dubstep-meets-hip-hop-beats and synth accents", while Ham called it a track with "synthesizers worthy of Trent Reznor and a sexy, chrome-colored beat."

Opinions on the track "Burn the Night Away" differed between Overly and Ham. While Ham praised the "simmering pulse" and "jerking dubstep rhythms" of the remix, Overly had a more negative opinion on the track, claiming that it "loses [the] heartstring-pulling connectivity" of the original due to "...distortion and dance club beats."

Overly's opinions on the new tracks from the album were positive. He described the song "Small World" as "captur[ing] the magic the band traditionally brings to their albums and the stage", pointing out that it "...also showcases a new aural maturity at the same time.", while also collectively describing "Small World" and "Soul Full Solace (Interlude)" as having "intimate lyricism", and "balanc[ing] [Maika Maile's] sweeping vocals and guitarist Christian Climer’s anthemic arena rock shredding."

Additionally, Overly named "Re:Stories" as the album's standout track.

Track listing

Personnel
Maika Maile
Christian Climer
Jay Enriquez
Christopher Kamrada

References

External links
Official MySpace Profile
Official YouTube channel

2010 EPs
There for Tomorrow albums
Hopeless Records EPs